documenta III was the third edition of documenta, a quinquennial contemporary art exhibition. It was held between 27 June and 5 October 1964 in Kassel, West Germany. The artistic director was Arnold Bode in collaboration with Werner Haftmann. The title of the exhibition was: Internationale Ausstellung – international exhibition.

Participants

References 

Documenta 3
1964 in Germany
1964 in art